Hammond's flycatcher (Empidonax hammondii) is a flycatcher in the family Tyrannidae. This small insectivorous bird inhabits the coniferous and mixed forests of western North America. The name of this bird commemorates William Alexander Hammond who was the surgeon general of the US Army. Hammond collected bird specimens for Spencer Fullerton Baird.

Description 
Adults are 12–14 cm long (4.7-5.5 in), span about 22 cm (8.7 in) across the wing and weigh 8-12 g (0.3-04 oz). They have grayish-olive upperparts, darker on the wings and tail, with whitish underparts; they have a conspicuous white eye ring, white wing bars, a small bill and a short tail. The breast is washed with grey and the sides of the belly with yellow. Female usually have a shorter, wider bill compare with male's. Immature are similar to adults, but have broader wing bars and are more buff.

Many species of Empidonax flycatchers look closely alike. Hammond's flycatchers are mainly confused with Dusky (E. oberholseri) and Gray (E. wrightii) flycatchers, which are similar in color and size and have an overlapping range. The best way to distinguish the Hammond's flycatcher is by its call, breeding habitat and/or range.

Taxonomy 
Hammond's flycatchers are part of the genus Empidonax, which includes a dozen of other species. Despite the relatively large range of the species, the Hammond's flycatcher does not present a lot of genetic variations. This might be the result of a bottleneck event, that could have occurred when the species range was confined to the South of the Pleistocene ice. The bird's morphology, including its plumage, is also consistent across its range. However, there are evidence showing that some Hammond's flycatcher on Vancouver Island, in British Columbia, have evolved longer, thicker bills in the absence of Western flycatchers, which occupy a very similar niche but usually has a thicker bill than the Hammond's flycatcher. The Hammond's, the Dusky and the Gray flycatchers are sister species, with no evidence of interbreeding.

Habitat and distribution 
The Hammond's flycatcher is a migratory species, breeding in Western North America and wintering in Mexico and Central America.

Habitat 
Their preferred breeding habitats are mature coniferous and mixed forests. They are typically found in dense fir forests, conifer and aspen forests and dogwood. Their habitats on wintering grounds are similar to the ones used as breeding grounds.

Distribution 
Hammond's flycatchers can be found in the Western United States, including Montana, Wyoming, California, Nevada, Utah, Arizona, New Mexico and Colorado. In Canada, their range include British Columbia, Yukon and Alberta. Certain birds have been found as far North as Alaska. Overall, their breeding range is formed by regions that have been greatly influenced by past glaciation events. These birds are migratory and winter in Mexico and in Central America.

Behavior

Vocalizations 
The call is a sharp .

Hammond's flycatchers do not sing during the fall migration or on wintering grounds. They start singing in early May, shortly after their arrival on breeding grounds. The frequency of the song is usually higher at the beginning of the mating season and drops as summer progresses; males that do not have a partner sing more often and at a higher frequency than paired males.

Like in other species of the genus Empidonax, bill snapping and mandibles clicking are commonly used in a threatening context.

Diet 
Their favorite preys include beetles, flies, bees, butterflies and moths, with a mean length of 5.7 mm and a mean weight of 1.656 mg. True beetles, and net-winged insects can also be part of their diet. They wait on an open perch high or in the middle of a tree and fly out to catch insects in flight, (hawking), also sometimes picking insects from foliage while hovering, (gleaning).

Reproduction 
These birds are believed to be monogamous and show no evidence of extra-pair copulation. Male Hammond's flycatcher physically fight at the beginning of the breeding season, locking themselves together in midair and fluttering to the ground. They tend to nest on high, small to medium-sized branches of tall trees. They also prefer areas where they can be covered by leaves, on the northeast or southwest sides of trees. Finally, they prefer old-growth forest, with a minimum age of 80 to 90 years.

They make a cup nest on a fork in a tree. Females usually lay in early June three or four creamy white eggs, sometimes marked with small reddish-brown dots. The female incubates the eggs for about 15 days. The hatchlings are altricial; both the male and the female are responsible of feeding the young.

References

External links
Photo gallery - VIREO
Photo; Article with photos – schmoker.org
Hammond's flycatcher sounds - Macaulay Library
Hammond's flycatcher species account - Cornell lab of Ornithology

Hammond's flycatcher
Native birds of Alaska
Native birds of Western Canada
Native birds of the Western United States
Hammond's flycatcher
Hammond's flycatcher
Birds of the Sierra Madre Occidental
Birds of Mexico
Birds of the Sierra Madre Oriental
Birds of the Sierra Madre del Sur
Birds of the Trans-Mexican Volcanic Belt